2.02 (GRAU index serial number 11F35 4K) is the designation of the fourth built Soviet/Russian Buran-class orbiter to be produced as part of the Buran programme.

History
Construction of 2.02 is believed to begin in 1988. The spacecraft belong to the second series orbiters, whose design has been improved considering experience of flight of K1 Buran.

By 1993, when the Buran program was cancelled, orbiter 2.02 was in an early stage of construction (10-20 percent). Only forward fuselage with crew cabin was completed. The incomplete 2.02 was later partially dismantled at its construction site and moved to the outside of the Tushino Machine Building Plant, near Moscow.

Right wing with landing gear produced for this orbiter was used to complete 0.01 test article, now on display at VDNKh

Some of the tiles from orbiter 2.02 were sold and auctioned on the Internet.

See also

 Buran programme
 Spaceplane

References

External links
 2.02 orbiter
 2.02 current status 

Buran-class orbiters
Cancelled Soviet spacecraft